Sofia Thermal Power Plant is a power plant situated near the capital of Bulgaria, Sofia. It has an installed capacity of 130 MW.

See also

 Energy in Bulgaria

Coal-fired power stations in Bulgaria
Economy of Sofia
Bulgaria–Soviet Union relations
Soviet foreign aid